In baseball statistics, strikeout-to-walk ratio (K/BB) is a measure of a pitcher's ability to control pitches, calculated as strikeouts divided by bases on balls.

A hit by pitch is not counted statistically as a walk, and therefore not counted in the strikeout-to-walk ratio.

The inverse of this calculation is the related statistic for hitters, walk-to-strikeout ratio (BB/K).

Leaders

Through 2022, the all-time career leaders among starting pitchers were Chris Sale (5.3333), Jacob de Grom (5.3036), and Tommy Bond (5.0363).

Through May 22, 2019, the all-time career leaders among relievers were Koji Uehara (7.94), Sean Doolittle (6.41), and Roberto Osuna (6.33).

The player with the highest single regular season K/BB ratio through 2022 was Minnesota Twins pitcher Phil Hughes in 2014, with a ratio of 11.625 (186 strikeouts and 16 walks). He is followed by Bret Saberhagen (11.00 in 1994) and Cliff Lee (10.28 in 2010).  

In 2016, Clayton Kershaw struck out 172 batters while walking only 11 for a ratio of 15.6; however he pitched only 149 innings, not enough to qualify for the record.

A pitcher who possesses a great K/BB ratio is usually a dominant power pitcher, such as Randy Johnson, Pedro Martínez, Curt Schilling, or Mariano Rivera. However, in 2005, Minnesota Twins starting pitcher Carlos Silva easily led the major leagues in K/BB ratio with 7.89:1, despite striking out only 71 batters over 188⅓ innings pitched; he walked only nine batters.

References

Pitching statistics
Statistical ratios